Tropical Storm Beryl was the third tropical storm of the 2006 Atlantic hurricane season. Developing from a tropical disturbance on July 18, it tracked generally northward, and strengthened to attain peak winds of  under generally favorable conditions. After turning to the northeast, Beryl weakened over cooler waters. On July 21 it struck the island of Nantucket, and shortly thereafter it became extratropical. The extratropical remnants continued northeastward through Nova Scotia, and on July 22 it merged with an approaching cold front.

Beryl produced rough seas along the northeast United States coastline. In Massachusetts, its impact was limited to light rainfall and gusty winds, with no reported damage. Beryl later produced moderate rainfall and gusty winds across Atlantic Canada, resulting in some localized power outages though little damage. No deaths were reported.

Meteorological history 

A cold front moved off the East Coast of the United States on July 16 and stalled off the coast of North Carolina. The first low quickly organized into an unnamed tropical storm, and the other area initially remained broad and ill-defined.

The depression moved slowly to the north-northwest through a break in the subtropical ridge, and as convective banding features became more prominent the system intensified into Tropical Storm Beryl. Throughout much of its duration, the storm tracked through an environment with light vertical wind shear and well-established upper-level outflow. Shortly after becoming a tropical storm, the low-level circulation of Beryl became exposed with limited deep convection, though deep convection re-developed the following morning.

Beryl maintained peak winds for about 18 hours as it paralleled the Mid-Atlantic and New Jersey coasts, during which an eye-like feature developed in the center of the convection. Late on July 20, it began a slow weakening trend after passing over cooler waters. Steering winds ahead of an approaching mid-level trough caused Beryl to accelerate northeastward, and early on July 21 the center of the storm crossed the island of Nantucket. The convection diminished as it moved through progressively colder waters, and shortly after 1200 UTC on July 21 Beryl became an extratropical cyclone a short distance east of Cape Cod. Hours later, it made landfall in southwestern Nova Scotia, and on July 22 the extratropical remnants of Beryl merged with an approaching cold front over Newfoundland.

Preparations 
Forecasters initially predicted Beryl to brush the Carolinas; as such, a tropical storm watch was issued for the eastern coast of North Carolina from Cape Lookout northward to Currituck Beach Lighthouse. When a more northeastward track became apparent, a tropical storm watch was issued about 33 hours prior to moving ashore from Woods Hole to Plymouth, Massachusetts, including Cape Cod, Nantucket, and Martha's Vineyard. About 22 hours before landfall, the National Hurricane Center replaced the watch with a tropical storm warning for the same area, and also issued a tropical storm watch from Woods Hole, Massachusetts westward to New Haven, Connecticut and for the eastern portion of Long Island from east of Fire Island to Port Jefferson. In anticipation for the storm, the Massachusetts Emergency Management Agency was activated as a trial run for the hurricane season. Local Red Cross chapters were opened, as well, with two volunteer teams placed on standby to assist. Across southeastern Massachusetts, police departments maintained extra staff in preparation for any potential problems from the storm. Many fishermen secured their boats, while some business owners boarded up windows to prevent storm damage.

Several days prior to the passage of Beryl through Atlantic Canada, the Canadian Hurricane Centre issued gale warnings for the coastal waters off Nova Scotia and Newfoundland. In anticipation of heavy rainfall, the agency also issued heavy rainfall warnings for western Nova Scotia, including Halifax.

Impact 

The storm caused high waves along the East Coast of the United States, with 19-foot seas (5.97 m) in the open ocean. Waves along the southern coast of Nantucket reached  in height as the storm approached the island, resulting in four people being rescued by lifeguards from rip currents.
High surf also occurred along the southern coast of Massachusetts, prompting the closing of the ferries between Nantucket and Cape Cod. Beryl dropped moderate precipitation just offshore, though the maximum precipitation total in the United States was only  on Nantucket. Rainfall along southeastern Massachusetts reached  at Chatham. The only reported damage were some downed telephone poles and fallen tree branches. Overall impact was minor; there were no reported power outages, deaths, injuries, or maritime emergencies in association with the storm.

Additionally, a station in Fredericton, New Brunswick reported  in two hours. The rainfall caused some flooding, with some overflown streams flooding some streets. The winds downed some tree limbs and led to some power outages. Overall damage was minor.

See also 

 List of New England hurricanes
 Timeline of the 2006 Atlantic hurricane season
 List of storms in the 2006 Atlantic hurricane season

References

External links 

 The NHC's archive on Tropical Storm Beryl.

2006 Atlantic hurricane season
Atlantic tropical storms
Hurricanes in New England
2006 natural disasters in the United States
Beryl